Stephen Tvrtko (also Stjepan Tvrtko or Stefan Tvrtko) may refer to:

 Stephen Tvrtko I, ruler of medieval Bosnia (1353–1366 and again 1367–1391)
 Stephen Tvrtko II, ruler of medieval Bosnia (1404–1409 and again 1421–1443)

See also
Tvrtko (disambiguation)
Tvrtko of Bosnia (disambiguation)
Tvrtko Kotromanić (disambiguation)
List of rulers of Bosnia